Wilaiporn Boothduang ( born 25 June 1987) is a Thai international footballer who plays as a midfielder.

International goals

References

External links 
 
 

1987 births
Living people
Wilaiporn Boothduang
Women's association football midfielders
Wilaiporn Boothduang
Wilaiporn Boothduang
Footballers at the 2010 Asian Games
Footballers at the 2014 Asian Games
2015 FIFA Women's World Cup players
Wilaiporn Boothduang
Southeast Asian Games medalists in football
Footballers at the 2018 Asian Games
Competitors at the 2007 Southeast Asian Games
2019 FIFA Women's World Cup players
Wilaiporn Boothduang
Competitors at the 2019 Southeast Asian Games
Wilaiporn Boothduang
FIFA Century Club
Wilaiporn Boothduang
Wilaiporn Boothduang